Jonas Hofmann (born 7 February 1997) is a German footballer who plays as a midfielder for Energie Cottbus. He made his debut for the Schalke 04 first-team in 2020, coming off the bench against Bayer Leverkusen in a 1-1 draw.

References

External links
 Profile at DFB.de
 Profile at kicker.de

1997 births
Living people
Sportspeople from Bamberg
Footballers from Bavaria
German footballers
Germany youth international footballers
Association football midfielders
1. FC Nürnberg II players
Sportfreunde Lotte players
FC Schalke 04 II players
FC Schalke 04 players
FC Energie Cottbus players
Bundesliga players
3. Liga players
Regionalliga players